Rodney Bryant is an American law enforcement officer who served as Chief of Police of Atlanta from June 13, 2020 until June 2, 2022.

Education 
Bryant earned a Bachelor of Science degree in criminal justice from Georgia State University and a Master of Science in administration from Central Michigan University.

Career 
Before attending college, Bryant joined the Atlanta Police Department in 1988 as a peace officer. After earning his bachelor's and master's degree, Bryant served as Police Executive Commander in the City of Atlanta. He was named Assistant Chief of Police in 2017. He was named Sergeant-at-Arms for the National Organization of Black Law Enforcement Executives in 2016.

Bryant became the interim Chief of Police at the request of Mayor Keisha Lance Bottoms, following the resignation of Erika Shields, who left her position after the killing of Rayshard Brooks in June 2020. On May 4, 2021, he was appointed chief on a permanent basis.

References 

Chiefs of the Atlanta Police Department
Georgia State University alumni
Central Michigan University alumni
African Americans in law enforcement
African-American police officers
Year of birth missing (living people)
Living people
21st-century African-American people